Trimbak Krishnarao Tope (popularly known as Dr. T. K. Tope) (28 February 1914 - 21 February 1994), was an authority on Constitutional Law, a noted educationist, a biographer, an Indian lawyer, and teacher. He was Principal of the Government Law College, Mumbai from 1958 to 1975. He served as the Vice-Chancellor of Bombay University from 1971 to 1977. Tope was the Sheriff of Mumbai from 10 December 1985 – 20 December 1986. He participated in the 1930 and 1942 movements.

References

Bibliography

1914 births
Year of death missing
Indian academic administrators
Indian biographers
20th-century Indian educators
Indian lawyers
Sheriffs of Mumbai